Jar-Kyshtak (formerly: Kirov) is a village in Yrys rural community, Suzak District, Jalal-Abad Region, Kyrgyzstan. Its population was 6,253 in 2021.

Population

References
 

Populated places in Jalal-Abad Region